4-Chloroaniline is an organochlorine compound with the formula ClC6H4NH2. This pale yellow solid is one of the three isomers of chloroaniline.

Preparation
4-Chloroaniline is not prepared from aniline, which tends to overchlorinate. Instead, it is prepared by reduction of 4-nitrochlorobenzene, which in turn is prepared by nitration of chlorobenzene.

Uses 
4-Chloroaniline is used in the industrial production of pesticides, drugs, and dyestuffs. It is a precursor to the widely used antimicrobial and bacteriocide chlorhexidine and is used in the manufacture of pesticides, including pyraclostrobin, anilofos, monolinuron, and chlorphthalim.

4-Chloroaniline exhibits antimicrobial action against some bacteria and molds.

References 

Anilines
Chlorobenzenes